Fabian Götze (born 3 June 1990) is a German footballer who is currently a free agent.

Career
Götze began his career with SC Ronsberg and later signed for FC Eintracht Hombruch. In summer 2001, he was scouted by Borussia Dortmund. He made his debut for Borussia Dortmund II squad on 25 July 2007 in the 3. Liga. He left Borussia Dortmund on 5 January 2010 and signed a contract with FSV Mainz 05 which expired on 30 June 2013.

Statistics

Personal life
Fabian is the brother of Mario Götze playmaker at PSV Eindhoven, born exactly two years apart, and Felix, is also a footballer for FC Augsburg.

References

External links
 

1990 births
Living people
German footballers
3. Liga players
Regionalliga players
Borussia Dortmund II players
1. FSV Mainz 05 II players
VfL Bochum II players
SpVgg Unterhaching players
Germany youth international footballers
Association football defenders
Footballers from Dortmund
Footballers from Bavaria
People from Ostallgäu
Sportspeople from Swabia (Bavaria)